Alcantarí International Airport  is an airport that serves Sucre, Bolivia, the nation's constitutional capital city. It is in the Yamparáez municipality.

The airport was inaugurated on May 15, 2016, after because of the old Sucre Airport being in a dangerous area and space concerns around it, it was decided to build a better and bigger facility than the old airport.

History 
The airport replaces the Juana Azurduy de Padilla International Airport that ceased commercial flights due to continuous complaints about security issues. In 2011 the construction of the new airport finally started, the first commercial flight was made on May 15, and on May 25, 2016, the operations officially started.

Characteristics 
The modern airport has a platform of 28,000 m2, a passenger terminal of 5.660 m2, a 3600 m track and all airport property comprises some 345 hectares.

Unlike the old Sucre airport, this airport can have night operations, plus the airport project will continue until 2020 to improve it even more, and get to have a cargo terminal and be an international airport.

Airlines and destinations

References

External links 
 promotional video

Airports in Chuquisaca Department